Mindmeld or Mind meld may refer to:

 Star Trek mind melds, a form of telepathic touch performed by Vulcans.
 Dagger of the Mind, the Star Trek episode with the first appearance of the Vulcan mind meld.
 Spock, the Star Trek character who generally performs the Vulcan mind meld.
 Mind Meld: Secrets Behind the Voyage of a Lifetime, a 2001 American documentary film.

See also
 Mind (disambiguation)
 Meld (disambiguation)